Mangart Saddle or the Mangart Pass ( or ) is a mountain saddle in the Julian Alps in northwestern Slovenia. It is the most common starting point for the ascent of Mt. Mangart. It was built in 1938. The Mangart Pass offers a picturesque  view towards the Log Koritnica Valley in Slovenia to the south and the Lakes of Fusine in Italy to the north. The Mangart Saddle Lodge lies under the saddle. The saddle was the scenery of the film Let's Go Our Own Way. Mangart Saddle is also known as the finding place of manganese nodules from the Early Jurassic period.

References

External links

Mountain passes of the Alps
Mountain passes of Slovenia
Mountain passes of the Julian Alps
Geology of Slovenia
Municipality of Bovec